Scotch Corner is a junction of the A1(M) and A66 trunk roads near Richmond in North Yorkshire, England. The junction's name is derived from the fact that it is the point of divergence for traffic coming from London, the East Midlands and Yorkshire wishing to continue either to Edinburgh and eastern Scotland (along the A1(M)) or to Glasgow and western Scotland (by taking the A66).

Geography
The A1(M) leads north towards North East England and Scotland, and south towards London. The A66 leads north-west towards Penrith and the M6 motorway. There are also three other exits from the junction: the A6055 road north and south, with the southbound side leading to the A6108 towards the Yorkshire Dales and Richmond. The third exit is towards Middleton Tyas and Croft-on-Tees and is a minor road which also provides access to the services.

Etymology and history

The name originated from being the junction where the north–south Roman road known as "Dere Street", which crossed the River Tees at Piercebridge, met the Roman road which went west through Bowes and Brough. It is where travellers to eastern Scotland (now via A1(M) and/or A68) are separated from travellers to western Scotland (now via A66 and M6/ A74(M)/M74).

The Romans were responsible for building the first roads to meet at this point and the site of the original junction is just a few hundred yards away from the modern day intersection. In AD 71 the Romans took control of the North when they defeated the Brigantes, a Northern Celtic tribe at the Battle of Scotch Corner (1st century). There was a major Roman settlement at Scotch Corner, with its own mint.

The Battle of Scotch Corner (14th century) (also known as the Battle of Old Byland) was a significant encounter between Scots and English troops in Yorkshire in October 1322, forming part of the Wars of Scottish Independence. 

The route now called the A66 was once 'the winter road' from Scotch Corner to Glasgow, by way of Carlisle. 'The summer road' runs from Barnard Castle, along Teesdale to Alston, then through Brampton to Gretna in Scotland. Particularly for cattle droving, the shorter route was advantageous when passable. The Summer Road is one of the most spectacular routes in England. The summer road follows what is now the B6278, B6277, and A689.

The £8 million Scotch Corner diversion opened in July 1971, which created a grade separated junction on the A1.

A £380 million upgrade of the A1 between Leeming Bar and Barton Interchange meant that the road was upgraded to three-lane motorway standard in March 2018. This created the opportunity for further archaeological investigation.

Facilities

A staging post with an inn, The Three Tuns, subsequently became a roadhouse in the early days of motorised travel.  The Scotch Corner Hotel was established there in 1939, built on the site of a mid-16th century inn and now operated by Holiday Inn. Almost as soon as it was opened, part of the hotel was requisitioned by the Royal Air Force for convalescing airmen. In 2011 it underwent a £3 million refurbishment.

A Moto Hospitality service station, built in 1980, has an attached Travelodge motel. The Moto offers a Costa Coffee, Marks & Spencer, Burger King, WHSmith, KFC, an Esso petrol station, toilets and an electric vehicle charging station.

See also
List of road junctions in the United Kingdom: S

References

External links

Page detailing the history of Scotch Corner

Motorway junctions in England
Moto motorway service stations
Transport in North Yorkshire
A1(M) motorway service stations
Richmondshire